David Sutherland may refer to:

 David Sutherland (baseball) (born 1985), Australian baseball player
 David Sutherland (comics) (1933–2023), Scottish comic book artist
 David Sutherland (cricketer) (1873–1971), Australian cricketer
 David Sutherland (golfer) (born 1966), American golfer
 David Sutherland (politician) (1803–1879), Scottish merchant, farmer and politician in South Australia
 David C. Sutherland III (1949–2005), American game designer
 David S. Sutherland (born 1948/49), American businessman
 David Sutherland (filmmaker) (born 1945), American documentary filmmaker
 Sudz Sutherland (David Sutherland), Canadian film maker
 David Macbeth Sutherland (1883–1973), Scottish artist
 David Sutherland (British Army officer) (1920–2006)
 D. M. Sutherland (1874–1951), British journalist and editor
 David Waters Sutherland (1872–1939), Australian physician
 David Sutherland (rugby union), Scottish rugby union referee